was the founder of the "dancing religion", Tensho Kotai Jingukyo.

Early life 
Kitamura was born on January 1, 1900, in what is now Yanai city, Yamaguchi prefecture, Japan. She was the fourth daughter in a farming family of Jodo Shinshu Buddhists. She got married in November 1920, and moved to Tabuse, Yamaguchi to be with her husband.

Career 
In July 1942, a barn on the Kitamura property burned down. Blaming herself for the incident, Kitamura began visiting a shaman. On May 4, 1944, Kitamura was possessed by a spirit, which was later said to be Tensho Kotaijin. She had her first sermon on July 22, 1945, during which she preached she had been sent to save the world, because it was about to end. She said that people should become "true human beings" in order to create a peaceful "land of god", and that Japan's defeat in World War II was just the prelude to a battle between good and evil. Her sermons included singing and dances of "non-ego", which earned the group the nickname "the dancing religion".

In 1946, she incorporated the sect as the Tensho Kotai Jinshukyo. Her son, Yoshito, performed the administrative functions of the new religion.

As the religion became more established, she became more critical of politicians, the emperor, and other people in power, calling them "maggots". She gained a lot of negative media attention, which she then used to publicize her group and gain followers. 

In 1952, Kitamura went on a mission trip to Hawaii. Her first overseas branch was in Kalihi, Hawaii. Soon, more branches were formed throughout the world, including in Europe, Africa, and South America. She eventually had over 300,000 followers.

Kitamura died in her home on December 28, 1967. In 1968, her granddaughter, Kitamura Kiyokazu, became head of the religion.

References 

1967 deaths
1900 births
People from Yamaguchi Prefecture
Founders of new religious movements
Japanese religious leaders